Bipin Tripathi Kumaon Institute of Technology, formerly Kumaon Engineering College (KEC), is an autonomous engineering and technology institute in the Almora district in state of Uttarakhand, India. The institute is located in the city of Dwarahat.

It is financed by the government of Uttarakhand and managed by the Board of Governors with the Minister of Technical Education Government of Uttarakhand as the chairman and Secretary of Technical Education as vice-chairman. Originally it is affiliated to Uttarakhand Technical University.

History
The college was established by the government of Uttar Pradesh in 1986 and started functioning in 1991. Now the institute is named after the renowned Uttarakhand movement activist Bipin Chandra Tripathi.

The foundation of college was under the guidance of Narayan Dutt Tiwari, Govt. of India on 20 April 1986, during the reign of late Chief Minister Vir Bahadur Singh; 155 acres of land were allotted for college by the UP Govt.

Academic session in B.E. was started with two branches, CSE and ECE (where CSE is considered as core branch of college), in 1991 with a well-planned educational program, similar to the one followed at IITs and RECs/NITs for the development of technology & engineering education facilities in the Kumaon Region. Seeing the availability, capability, and usefulness of land, the college prepared a master plan and project report regarding development in 1996, which was approved by the administrative council.

At present, the institute runs seven graduate engineering programs — Computer Science & Engineering, Electronics and Communication Engineering, Electrical Engineering, Civil Engineering, Chemical Engineering, Mechanical Engineering and Biochemical Engineering — and three postgraduate programs: Masters of Computer Applications, Master of Technology (M.Tech.) in CSE and Mechanical departments.

Besides this, the institute started PhD programs in 2016. The institute offers other infrastructural facilities for faculty and students, such as hostels, staff residential campus, departmental buildings, student's activity club and a multipurpose hall have been developed. An atmosphere conducive to learning and all-round personality development of the students is being created. Emphasis is being laid on self-discipline and mutual respect.

Location

The college is in the hilly region of Dwarahat on Kathgodam-Ranikhet-Karnaprayag National Highway (87-E), about 30 km from Ranikhet and about 3 km from Dwarahat near Gauchar village. The nearest railway station is at Haldwani (118 km).

The summer is pleasant with a maximum temperature of 30 °C for a few weeks; the rest of the time, the weather remains cool.

The Dunagiri and Panduakhal temples are at the outskirts of Dwarahat.

Administration and organization
The institute is administered by an autonomous society named "Bipin Tripathi Kumaun Institute of Technology Dwarahat Society" which is registered under the Societies Registration Act. The memorandum of association, society rules, bye-laws and employees conduct rules are duly approved by the Uttarakhand state government. The institute enjoys freedom with regard to internal administration and functioning.

The Administration Section of BTKIT, Dwarahat is headed by a registrar and functions under the overall supervision of the principal.

The following functions and duties are performed by the Administration Section:

All establishment matters pertaining to the teaching and non-teaching employees of the institute
Maintenance of their service books and personal files of all employees
Legal cases
Disciplinary cases
Conducting of meetings of the Board of Governors and KEC Society
Recruitment of regular, ad hoc and contract employees and maintenance of Roster Register
Processing of Career Advancement and Assured Career Progression Cases
Printing of advertisements on behalf of the institute
Central dispatch work
Vigilance cases

Academics
The college offers Bachelor of Technology and Master of Technology degrees, as well as Master of Computer Applications. It offers CCNA and Oracle (scheduled) courses.

Undergraduate courses 
The college has departments that offer seven B.Tech. degree programs in Electrical Engineering, Electronics & Communication Engineering, Computer Science & Engineering, Mechanical Engineering, Bio-chemical Engineering, Civil Engineering & Chemical Engineering.

Postgraduate courses 
The college provides three M.Tech. degrees programs in VLSI (ECE), Thermal Engineering (ME) and Computer Science & Engineering (CSE). The institute is offers a three-year degree program in Master of Computer Applications.

Doctoral program 
The college started offering the Doctor of Philosophy degree (Ph.D.) as part of its doctoral education programme in disciplines from July 2016.

Aarohan 
The national-level techfest Aarohan was being organised in the odd semester every year.

Departments
The college has eight departments:
Applied Science
Computer Science Engineering
Electronics Engineering
Mechanical Engineering
Biochemical Engineering
Electrical Engineering
Civil Engineering
Chemical Engineering

Library 

The college has a Central Library, which is open access. Students and staff have access to a large number of books and journals, besides many competitive and technical magazines. The library is procuring about 14 international journals and 50 national journals. It is the heart of academic and research activities of BTKIT. It has been catering to the needs of faculty members, research scholars, and students on campus. It has huge volumes of books and e-journals which cover the disciplines of technology, computer science, management, humanities, applied science and other related areas.

The library with its modern collection of knowledge resources and innovative information services fills an essential role for the academic community in their intellectual pursuits at BTKIT. It is provided to students, staff and faculty members for updating their knowledge and supporting the research and teaching/learning activities. These services are provided through the central library and departmental libraries.

The library consists of 45000 books with around 6000 titles as well as national and international journals and magazines for enhancing the knowledge of the students. In addition, the institute has a digital library with complete study material from NPTEL and VISIONET. An online library facility is provided to students to help them in getting better books.

The library, however, lacks variety - there is a dearth of fiction books (novels, timeless classics, poetries, etc.). Most of the books are the ones to be distributed among the students for the following academic year.

Hostels
The college has nine boys' and three girls' hostels and one transit hostel. All the hostels have large space and privacy. Each hostel has its own mess, common room and garden in its own premises. All hostels are inside the campus itself and the academic block and all departments are nearest.

New Boy's Hostel and Vindhyanchal hostel were built as a set of single rooms for individual students but currently, two students are living in one room of the hostel thereof.

One boys' hostel (180 single seated) is under construction. The following are the hostels in KEC: 
Aravali Hostel [90 X 2] BTech, final year and MCA 2nd Year Boys
Trishul Hostel [25 X 2], MCA First Year Boys and M.Tech. Boys
Nanda Devi Hostel [60 X 3] B.Tech., Second Year Boys
Shivalik Hostel [30 X 2] B.Tech., First Year Boys 
Gaumukh Hostel [60 X 3]  B.Tech., First Year Boys 
Gangotri Hostel [60 X 3] B.Tech., Final Year Girls
Kailash Hostel [120 X 2] B.Tech., Final and Second Year Boys
Yamunotri Hostel [60 X 2] MCA, Pre-Final Year and B.Tech. Second Year girls
Nalanda Hostel [60 X 1] First Year Girls
Transit Hostel [60 X 1] First Year Girls
Vindhyachal Hostel [125 X 1] B.Tech., Third Year, Final Year Civil
New Boys Hostel [120 X 1] MCA, 2nd Year and B.Tech., Third Year 
Saraswati Hostel MCA, Pre-Final Year Girls and B.Tech., Pre-Final Year Girls

See also
 Seemant Institute of Technology, Pithoragarh
 Institute of Technology Gopeshwar, Gopeshwar

References

External links
 Bipin Chandra Tripathi
 Official website
 AAROHAN official website
 Official results Website

Engineering colleges in Uttarakhand
Almora district
Universities and colleges in Uttarakhand
Educational institutions established in 1991
1991 establishments in Uttar Pradesh